Protected areas of Moldova include following categories:

 Scientific nature reserves (rom. rezervații științifice) – currently 5 reserves covering an area of 19379 ha. They are equivalent to IUCN category Ia (strict nature reserve).
 National parks – currently there’s one national park, created in 2013 Orhei National Park (rom. Parcul Național Orhei) 
 Nature monuments (rom. monumente ale naturii)
 Nature reserves (rom. rezervații naturale)
 Landscape reserves (rom. rezervații peisagistice)
 Resource reserves (rom. rezervații de resurse)
 Areas with multifunctional management (rom. Arii cu management multifuncțional)
 Wetlands of international importance (rom. Zone umede de importanță internațională)
 Dendrological gardens (rom. grădini dendrologice)
 Landscape architecture monuments (rom. monumente de arhitectură peisajeră)
 Zoological garden in Chișinău  (rom. Grădina Zoologică din Chișinău)

National park

Scientific nature reserves

Ramsar wetlands

Landscape reserves

Monuments of landscape architecture

See also
 Protected areas of Romania
Protected areas of Ukraine

References